The sixth and final cycle of Asia's Next Top Model (subtitled as Asia's Next Top Model 6: Beyond Limits) premiered on August 22, 2018. Filming for the cycle took place in Bangkok, Thailand. Cindy Bishop and Yu Tsai both returned as judges for panel, while Monika Sta. Maria from cycle 3, Shikin Gomez and Nguyen Minh Tu from cycle 5 made appearances as model mentors throughout the cycle.

The cycle featured 14 contestants: three from Thailand, two from Indonesia and the Philippines, and one each from Hong Kong, Japan, Malaysia, Myanmar, Singapore, Taiwan and Vietnam. China, India, Mongolia, Nepal, and South Korea were unrepresented. Japan marked its comeback after its absences from the previous two cycles, while both Hong Kong and Myanmar returned after their absences from the previous cycle. 

The prize package for this cycle included a Subaru XV, a cover and fashion spread in Harper's Bazaar Thailand, a featured avatar in the new America's Next Top Model Mobile Game, and a modeling contract with Storm Model Management in London.

The winner of the competition was 24 year-old Dana Slosar, from Thailand.

Cast

Contestants
(Ages stated are at start of contest)

Judges
 Cindy Bishop (host)
 Yu Tsai

Other cast members
 Monika Sta. Maria – Alumni Model Mentor
 Shikin Gomez – Alumni Model Mentor
 Nguyen Minh Tu – Alumni Model Mentor

Episodes

Results

 The contestant was eliminated
 The contestant was eliminated outside of judging panel 
 The contestant won the competition

Average  call-out order
Episode 10 is not included.

Scores 

 Indicates the contestant had the highest score that week
 Indicates the contestant was in the bottom that week
 Indicates the contestant was eliminated that week
 Indicates the contestant was eliminated outside the judging panel

Bottom two/three

 The contestant was eliminated after their first time in the bottom two. 
 The contestant was eliminated after their second time in the bottom two. 
 The contestant was eliminated after their third time in the bottom two. 
 The contestant was eliminated and placed as the runner-up/s.
 The contestant was eliminated outside of judging panel.

Notes

References

External links
Official website 

Asia's Next Top Model
2018 Thai television seasons
Television shows filmed in Thailand